Dendrobium nindii, commonly known as the blue antler orchid, is an epiphytic or lithophytic orchid in the family Orchidaceae. It has erect, cylindrical, leafy pseudobulbs with leathery, dark green leaves and up to twenty mauve or violet flowers with darker veins on the labellum. This antler orchid occurs in tropical North Queensland and New Guinea.

Description
The sepals and petals are slightly twisted and spread widely apart from each other. The side lobes are relatively large, curve upwards and often have wavy edges. The middle lobe is shorter with wavy edges and a square-cut tip. Flowering occurs from July to September.

Taxonomy and naming
Dendrobium nindii was first formally described in 1874 by Walter Hill in Report on the Brisbane Botanic Garden from a specimen collected by Philip Henry Nind "on trees overhanging tidal streams, Moresby and Johnstone Rivers". The specific epithet (nindii) honours the collector of the type specimen.

Distribution and habitat
The blue antler orchid grows in trees including mangroves and palms, in coastal swamps and near-coastal rainforest between the McIlwraith Range and Innisfail on the Cape York Peninsula. It also grows in similar habitats in New Guinea including on the Vogelkop Peninsula and Eilanden River.

Conservation
This orchid is classed as "endangered" under the Australian Government Environment Protection and Biodiversity Conservation Act 1999 and under the Queensland Government Nature Conservation Act 1992. The main threats to the species are land clearing and illegal collection.

References

nindii
Orchids of New Guinea
Orchids of Queensland
Plants described in 1874